This is a list of compositions by Robert Volkmann.

Piano

Piano Solo
Six Fantasy Pictures, Op. 1
Dythyrambe and Toccata, Op. 4
Souvenir de Maróth, Op. 6
Nocturne, Op. 8
Piano Sonata in C minor, Op. 12
Buch der Lieder, Op. 17
Deutsche Tanzweisen, Op. 18
Cavatine, Op. 19/1
Barcarole, Op. 19/2
Ungarische Lieder, Op. 20
Visegrád, 12 musikalische Dichtungen (12 Musical Poems), Op. 21
   Der Schwur (The Oath)
   Waffentanz (Sword-Dance)
   Beim Bankett (At the Banquet)
   Minne (Love)
   Blumenstück (Flower-Garden)
   Brautlied (Wedding Song)
   Die Wahrsagerin (The Sybil)
   Pastorale
   Das Lied can Helden (Song of Heroes)
   Der Page (The Page)
   Soliman
   Am Salomonsthurm - Elegie (At Salomon's Tower - Elegy)
4 Marches, Op. 22
Wanderskizzen, Op. 23
Fantasia, Op. 25a
Intermezzo, Op. 25b
Variations on a Theme by Handel, Op. 26
Lieder der Grossmutter, Op. 27
3 Improvisations, Op. 36
Au tombeau du Comte Széchenyi – Fantaisie, Op. 41
Ballade, Op. 51/1
Scherzetto, Op. 51/2
Variationes Humoris Causa
Variations on the Rheinweinlied
Capricietto

Piano, four hands
Ungarische Skizzen (Hungarian Sketches) for piano, four hands, Op. 24 (1861)
   Zum Empfange
   Das Fischermädchen
   Ernster Gang
   Junges Blut
   In der Kapelle
   Ritterstück
   Unter der Linde
Lieder der Großmutter for piano, four hands, Op. 27 (1856)
Die Tageszeiten, Op. 39 (1859)
3 Marches, Op. 40 (1859)
Musicalisches Bilderbuch, Op. 11 (1852/53)
   'In der Mühle', Op. 11/1
   ‘Der Postillon’, Op. 11/2
   ‘Die Russen kommen’, Op. 11/3 (The Russians Are Coming)
   ‘Auf dem See’, Op. 11/4
   ‘Der Kuckuck und der Weihnachtsmann’, Op. 11/5
   ‘Der Schäfer’, Op. 11/6
Rondino and March Caprice, Op. 55 (1867)
Sonatina for 2 Pianos, Op. 57 (1868)

Chamber music

Violin and Piano
Romance in E major for Violin and Piano, Op. 7
Chant du Troubadour, Op. 10
Allegretto capriccioso for Violin and Piano, Op. 15
Rhapsody for Violin and Piano, Op. 31
Sonatina No. 1 for Violin and Piano, Op. 60
Sonatina No. 2 for Violin and Piano, Op. 61

Cello and Piano
Capriccio for Cello and Piano, Op. 74

Piano Trio
Piano Trio No. 1 in F major, Op. 3
Piano Trio No. 2 in B-flat minor, Op. 5

String Quartet
String Quartet No. 1 in A minor, Op. 9
String Quartet No. 2 in G minor, Op. 14
String Quartet No. 3 in G major, Op. 34
String Quartet No. 4 in E minor, Op. 35
String Quartet No. 5 in F minor, Op. 37
String Quartet No. 6 in E-flat major, Op. 43

Other
Trio for Viola, Cello and Piano, Op. 76
Andante mit Variationen for Three Cellos
Romanza for Trumpet, Horn and Euphonium

Orchestra

Symphonies
Symphony No. 1 in D minor, Op. 44
Symphony No. 2 in B-flat major, Op. 53

Piano and Orchestra
Konzertstück for piano and orchestra, Op. 42

Cello and Orchestra
Cello Concerto in A minor, Op. 33

Voice and Orchestra 

 'An die Nacht', Fantasiestück for Alto and Orchestra, Op. 45

Choral Music
Mass No. 1 in D major, Op. 28 for unaccompanied male choir (TTBB)
Mass No. 2 in A-flat major, Op. 29 for unaccompanied male choir (TTTBB)
6 Songs, Op. 30 for unaccompanied male choir (TTBB)
Offertorium: Osanna domino Deo, Op. 47
3 Songs, Op. 48
2 Songs, Op. 58
Weihnachtslied, Op. 59
Altdeutscher Hymnus, Op. 64
Kirchenarie, Op. 65
2 Songs, Op. 70
3 Hochzeitslieder, Op. 71
2 Works, Op. 75
Ich Halte Ihr Die Augen Zu
Abendlied

Lieder
5 Songs, Op. 2
3 Gedichte, Op. 13
3 Songs, Op. 16
3 Songs, Op. 32
3 Songs, Op. 38
Songs, Op. 36
Sappho, Op. 49
3 Songs, Op. 52 (translated into English by Helen Tretbar)
Vom Hirtenknaben, Op. 56/1
Erinnerung, Op. 56/2
3 Songs, Op. 66
6 Duets, Op. 67
3 Songs, Op. 72
An die Nacht

References

External links
List of compositions (in German)
List of compositions

Volkmann